In Greek mythology, Callichore or Kallichore is sometimes considered one of the Muses, and thus a daughter of Zeus (Jupiter); a scholion to Hesiod's Works and Days by John Tzetzes names her. She is better known, however, as one of the Nysiads, nymphs who nursed Dionysus from Book 14 of the Dionysiaca by Nonnus.  Both the lunar crater Kallichore and Jupiter's moon Kallichore are named after her.

References 

Nymphs
Children of Zeus